Fausto Budicin (born 1 May 1981) is a Croatian professional football manager and former player who was most recently  manager of Croatian First Football League club Rijeka

Managerial career
On 27 March 2019, Budicin was appointed new manager at Croatian Third Football League club Orijent 1919. His first success at Orijent bench came at the end of the season; Orijent gained promotion to the second-tier Druga HNL finishing third in the 2018–19 Treća HNL West season.

In the club's inaugural second league season, Budicin led the squad to finishing in third at the league table in March 2020, when the championship was postponed due to the COVID-19 pandemic in Croatia. NK Croatia Zmijavci, that finished in second in the league championship, did not ask for a license to play in the First League, so Orijent took their place in the relegation play-offs for a higher tier, in which Istra 1961 was more successful.

After Orijent failed to gain promotion to the first tier, Budicin was named head coach of Istra 1961 on 26 August 2020, succeeding Ivan Prelec, whose contract expired and was not renewed. However he has been sacked on 11 February 2021. Budicin was named manager of Rijeka in June 2022, only to be replaced by Serse Cosmi after two months.

Career statistics

Managerial statistics

Honours

Player
Istra
Druga HNL (South): 2001–02

Olimpija Ljubljana
Slovenian Cup: 2002–03

Rijeka
Croatian Cup: 2005–06

Individual
Most appearances in Derby della Učka

Manager
Orijent 1919
Treća HNL (West) third-place promotion: 2018–19

References

External links
 

1981 births
Living people
Sportspeople from Pula
Croatian people of Italian descent
Association football defenders
Croatian footballers
Croatia youth international footballers
Croatia under-21 international footballers
NK Istra players
NK Olimpija Ljubljana (1945–2005) players
ASKÖ Pasching players
HNK Rijeka players
NK Istra 1961 players
HNK Rijeka II players
Croatian Football League players
Slovenian PrvaLiga players
Austrian Football Bundesliga players
Second Football League (Croatia) players
Croatian expatriate footballers
Expatriate footballers in Slovenia
Croatian expatriate sportspeople in Slovenia
Expatriate footballers in Austria
Croatian expatriate sportspeople in Austria
Croatian football managers
HNK Orijent managers
NK Istra 1961 managers
HNK Rijeka managers
HNK Rijeka non-playing staff